A gubernatorial election was held on 13 April 2003 to elect the Governor of Saga Prefecture. Newcomer Yasushi Furukawa won the election.

Candidates
 Yasushi Furukawa - retired (most recent job: former manager of Nagasaki Prefecture General Affairs Department), age 44
  - member of the Saga Prefectural Assembly, age 61
  - civil servant at MAFF and later mayor of Kashima, Saga, age 57
  - professor at Nasu University, age 55
  - former prefectural high school teacher union chairman, age 63
  - former prefectural superintendent of education, age 66

Results

References

Saga gubernatorial elections
2003 elections in Japan